Dionconotus neglectus is a plant bug belonging to the family Miridae, subfamily Mirinae. The species was first described by Johan Christian Fabricius in 1798.

Subspecies
Dionconotus neglectus neglectus (Fabricius, 1798)
Dionconotus neglectus major Wagner, 1968
Dionconotus neglectus neglectus (Fabricius, 1798)
Dionconotus neglectus sellatus Lindberg, 1930

Distribution
This species can mainly be found in France, Italy, Belgium, Bosnia and Croatia.

Description
Its body is usually black with red or yellow hemielytra.

Biology
These bugs are polyphagous, They develop on grasses and herbaceous weeds and migrate to orange trees. Adults can be found from mid-March to mid-May.

References

External links
 BioLib
 Discover Life

Hemiptera of Europe
Insects described in 1798
Mirini